Gerardus "Gé" Fortgens (July 10, 1887, in Haarlem – May 4, 1957, in Haarlem) was a Dutch amateur football (soccer) player. Fortgens was the first Ajax-player ever who was selected for the Netherlands national football team for the 1912 Summer Olympics and won the bronze medal.

References

External links
 
 
 

1887 births
1957 deaths
Dutch footballers
AFC Ajax players
HFC Haarlem players
Footballers at the 1912 Summer Olympics
Olympic footballers of the Netherlands
Olympic bronze medalists for the Netherlands
Footballers from Haarlem
Olympic medalists in football
Medalists at the 1912 Summer Olympics
Association football defenders
Association football midfielders
Netherlands international footballers